An air mattress is an inflatable mattress or sleeping pad.

Due to its buoyancy, it is also often used as a water toy or flotation device, and in some countries, including the UK and South Africa, is called a lilo ("Li-lo" being a specific trademark — derived from the phrase "lie low") or a Readybed.

For sleeping

An air mattress, also known as an airbed or a blow-up bed, is an inflatable mattress made of polyvinyl chloride (PVC) or textile-reinforced urethane plastic or rubber. The deflated mattress can be compacted and carried or stored in a small form. They are inflated by blowing into a valve, either with a manual or an electric pump. Some are automatically inflated when a valve is opened, up to a certain pressure with additional inflation manually or by pump.

Air mattresses are used for camping, temporary or full-time home use, and may be optimized to combine several uses (e.g., camping and guest use) while others are single purpose. Air mattresses may have customized shapes, such as wheel cutouts for use in the cargo area of a pickup truck or SUV.

Sleeping pads are lightweight, reduced-size and reduced-thickness air mattresses intended for camping and backpacking, and may feature a layer of foam insulation under the air chambers. Higher quality air chambers use vulcanized rubber, covered in canvas or of polyurethane with a cloth shell or tick(ing). Permanent air beds will look almost like conventional beds with the exception of having a hose (one air chamber) or hoses (two air chambers) coming out of the head of the bed. These hoses will be connected to an air inflation device, with two outlet valves, that will have a remote control(s) so that each person can adjust the firmness of his or her side to his/her own exact needs. The firmness can be adjusted up or down, with the simple push of a button, on the remote(s).

A USA government safety agency has warned against letting infants sleep on air mattresses, because they can be too soft and suffocate smaller children (especially those below the age of 8 months) within folds or while entrapped between the mattress and the bed base. Additionally there have been several recent governmental studies and regulations enacted due to the poisonous nature of the phthalate plasticizers contained within most PVC vinyl air beds and other soft vinyl products. The European Union has made similar efforts to prevent the use of vinyl materials in toys and bedding.

Air beds
Larger, more elaborate air mattresses (known as "air beds" in British English speaking locations) have come on the market in recent years that are intended for guest use or as permanent beds in the bedroom. Bed sizes for temporary air beds range from twin to king size, but few guest bed manufacturers offer king size as most guest air beds are sold outside the United States where king-size mattresses are not standard. Most permanent air beds use easy-to-find conventional sheets and bedding. California King (or Western King) sheets and bedding may be more difficult to find as this size was originally conceived for the waterbed industry.

Raised guest or temporary beds are typically raised off the ground to keep users away from the floor and offer a more traditional mattress experience. Though 'raised' air beds are off the ground, they are not designed for full-time use, as the base of the bed is an air chamber and not a solid foundation.

Health benefits
Air mattresses can also improve the quality of life (and potentially provide some measure of relief) for people who suffer with back pain. Having the ability to adjust the firmness of a mattress to accommodate different body shapes, sizes, and weights, can be a factor in the healing process. Air mattresses are sometimes used to protect bedridden people from pressure sores, which can create life-threatening ulcers. Additionally, air mattresses manufactured without the use of materials that may release VOCs or other toxic compounds from the manufacturing process (which can exacerbate allergies in children or other sensitive individuals) are available.

For recreation

As a water toy 
The term air mattress may also refer to a certain inflatable swimming pool or beach toy, which has an air-sac "pillow" and several (usually four or five) tubes running its length. Also called a "lilo" (UK, AUS, NZ, SA), "pool air mat", "air mat", "pool lounge", or "float(ing) mat(tress)", it is used to recline on the water surface. The Li-Lo trademark for a rubberised material products was registered in UK on 19 Apr 1944 and in the USA on 25 Sep 1947 by P. B. Cow and Co Ltd.  An inflatable air mattress for recreational use was advertised as one of the Li-Lo brand of products at the British Industries Fair in London 1949. Although it bears some resemblance to an air mattress, it is typically not built as strongly and may not reliably stay inflated all night long, making it impractical for use as a bed.

Industry 
Permanent use adjustable-firmness "airbeds" became popular particularly after market leader Select Comfort began a major marketing campaign around 2001. The original airbed was manufactured by Comfortaire in 1981, which was later purchased by Select Comfort, in January 2013 for $15.5m.  Select Comfort announced on March 30, 2017 that they were ceasing all third party retail sales, of the Comfortaire Line of products, essentially shutting down the Comfortaire Brand. Other manufacturers include Boyd Specialty, InnoMax, and American National.

Less expensive airbeds used for camping or guests include the Aerobed, sold by Jarden subsidiary The Coleman Company.

See also
 List of inflatable manufactured goods

References

External links
 
 

Beds
Camping equipment
Mattress
Mattresses
Water toys